Jackson Township is a defunct township in Shannon County, in the U.S. state of Missouri.

Jackson Township was erected in 1870, taking its name from Claiborne Fox Jackson, 15th Governor of Missouri.

References

Townships in Missouri
Townships in Shannon County, Missouri